Senator Hendricks may refer to:

Members of the United States Senate
Thomas A. Hendricks (1819–1885), U.S. Senator from Indiana from 1863 to 1869
William Hendricks (1782–1850), U.S. Senator from Indiana from 1825 to 1837

United States state senate members
Francis Hendricks (1834–1920), New York State Senate
Thomas Hendricks Sr. (1773–1835), Indiana State Senate
William Hendricks Jr. (1809–1850), Indiana State Senate

See also
Senator Hendrick (disambiguation)